Babu is a 1975 Indian Telugu-language drama film written by K. S. Prakash Rao and directed by K. Raghavendra Rao. The film stars Sobhan Babu, Vanisri and Lakshmi in key roles.

The film is a love story between two couples woven with strong family sentiments like objection from elders.

Cast
 Sobhan Babu
 Vanisri
 Lakshmi
 Chandramohan
 Gummadi
 Sukumari
 SVR
 Anjali Devi
 Raja Babu
Allu Ramalingaiah
Satyanarayana
G. Varalakshmi
Mikkilineni
Rao Gopal Rao
E.R.D. Ramulu

Soundtrack
 "Ayyababoy Adiripoyindi" (Singers: S. P. Balasubrahmanyam and P. Susheela)
 "Ennenni Vampulu Ennenni Sompulu Nakunnavemo Rendu Kannulu" (Singers: S. P. Balasubrahmanyam and P. Susheela)
 "Naa Sneham Pandi Premai Nindina Cheliya Ravela" (Lyrics: Aatreya; Singer: S. P. Balasubrahmanyam)
 "Oka Janta Kalisina Tarunana Jeganta Mrogenu Gudilona" (Singers: V. Ramakrishna and P. Susheela)
 "Oyamma Entalesi Siggochindi Siggochi Mogamenta Muddochindi" (Lyrics: Aatreya; Singer: P. Susheela)

Box office
The film ran for more than 50 days in four centers (Hyderabad, Rajahmundry, Visakhapatnam and Vijayawada) in Andhra Pradesh. and was a commercial success.

References

External links
 Babu - 1975 film at IMDb.

1975 films
Films scored by K. Chakravarthy
Films directed by K. Raghavendra Rao
Indian romantic drama films
1970s Telugu-language films
1975 romantic drama films